Wilfred Williams (born September 27, 1958) is a retired American basketball player who played one year at Brevard Community College and three years at Clemson University, before being drafted by the Houston Rockets in the 1980 NBA draft. However, he did not play in the NBA.

References
Profile —TheDraftReview.com

1958 births
Living people
American men's basketball players
AS Monaco Basket players
Basketball players from New York City
Clemson Tigers men's basketball players
Houston Rockets draft picks
Junior college men's basketball players in the United States
Montpellier Paillade Basket players
Needham B. Broughton High School alumni
Olympique Antibes basketball players
Paris Racing Basket players
Shooting guards
SLUC Nancy Basket players